Jake Zumbach (born July 15, 1950) is a retired Canadian football player who played for the Montreal Alouettes of the Canadian Football League (CFL). He played college football at Colorado.

References

1950 births
Living people
American football defensive ends
Canadian football defensive linemen
American players of Canadian football
Colorado Buffaloes football players
Montreal Alouettes players
Players of American football from New York (state)
Sportspeople from Binghamton, New York